Iran participated in the 2008 Asian Beach Games held in Bali, Indonesia from October 18, 2008 to October 26, 2008. At first Iran was supposed to send a big delegation to this event but finally only a beach soccer team represented Iran in Bali.

Competitors

Results by event

Beach soccer

Men

References

External links
 Official Website
 Iran national olympic committee

Nations at the 2008 Asian Beach Games
2008
Asian Beach Games